This is a list of the bird species of the family Dinornithidae.

Pachyornis
 †Pachyornis elephantopus
 †Pachyornis mappini
 †Pachyornis australis

Euryapteryx
 †Euryapteryx curtus

Emeus
 †Emeus crassus

Anomalopteryx
 †Anomalopteryx didiformis

Dinornis 
 †Dinornis novaezealandiae
 †Dinornis robustus

Megalapteryx
 †Megalapteryx didinus

Footnotes

References
 
 

Moa
Moa
Moa